The 1972 SCCA Formula Super Vee season was the second season of the Sports Car Club of America sanctioned Formula Super Vee championship.

Race calendar and results

Final standings

References

SCCA Formula Super Vee